Md Mainur Rahman SUP, awc, psc is a major general in the Bangladesh Army& General officer commanding (GOC) of 33 Infantry division. Before serving as GOC of 33 Infantry Division, he was the Director of WE&S Directorate, Army Headquarters.

Career 
Major General Mainur was commissioned in Bangladesh Army on 21 June 1991 with 24th BMA Long Course. He served as Assistant Military Secretary to The Honourable President Abdul Hamid while he was Brigadier General. He has been promoted to Major General on 20 July 2022.

References 

Living people
Bangladesh Army generals
Bangladeshi generals
Year of birth missing (living people)